The Rencong script, locally known as Surat Ulu ('upstream script') is a writing system family found in central and south Sumatra, in the regions of Kerinci, Bengkulu, Palembang and Lampung, Indonesia. It was used to write manuscripts in Sumatran languages and Malay, such as the Tanjung Tanah Code of Law. The Malay writing was gradually replaced by the Jawi script, a localized version of the Arabic script.

Naming 
The terms "surat" and "ulu" are the origin of the name Surat Ulu. While "ulu" ('upstream') refers to the highland region where the rivers in South Sumatra and Bengkulu originate (the Barisan Mountains), "Surat" refers to the script. The user community first referred to this script family as Surat Ulu.

The Rencong script is another well-known naming system. "Rencong" is thought to be derived from the Old Malay word mèncong, which means oblique/not straight. It could also be derived from the word runcing ('sharp'), as this script family was originally written with a sharp knife tip. Regardless of its origin, Western scholars frequently use this term to refer to this family of scripts.

The Kaganga script is another name for it. Mervyn A. Jaspan (1926-1975), an anthropologist at the University of Hull, coined the term to refer to all Brahmi script lineages, not just the Ulu scripts. The name "Kaganga" is derived from the first three letters of the Pāṇini sequence, which is used in the Brahmi (Indian) script family. This is equivalent to the word "alphabet," which is derived from the names of the first two letters of the Greek alphabet (Α-Β, alpha-beta), and the word "abjad," which is derived from the names of the first four letters of the Arabic alphabet (ا-ب-ج-د, alif-ba-jim-dal).

Several tribes have their own names in addition to the three mentioned above. For example, this script family is known as the surat ʁincung among the Pasemah ethnic group.

Materials 
Rencong script was often written on tree bark, bamboo, horns and palmyra-palm leaves.

Disambiguation
The term "Rencong" is often confused with "Rejang", which refers to a specific Rencong alphabet that was used to write various dialects of the Rejang language and for writing Malay in the region.

Distribution
This map below shows the distribution of various Rencong alphabets in South Sumatra:

Galleries

See also 

 Rejang alphabet
 Lampung alphabet

Notes

References

Bibliographies 
 

Brahmic scripts
Indonesian scripts